Barnes, also known as Barnes Cross Roads or Burns, is an unincorporated community in Dale County, Alabama, United States.

History
A post office operated under the name Barnes Cross Roads from 1844 to 1895.

Company B (known as "The Dale County Grays") of the 33rd Regiment Alabama Infantry was partially made up of men from Barnes. A portion of the 15th Regiment Alabama Infantry also came from Barnes.

References

Unincorporated communities in Dale County, Alabama
Unincorporated communities in Alabama